The Secretary for Mines was a ministry first established in 1874 in the first ministry of Henry Parkes. It went through various title changes, becoming the Minister for Mines in 1959 then variations on Minister for Mineral Resources .

Role and responsibilities
In 1872-3 there was a rush of application for mineral leases covering , which were required to be dealt with by the Secretary for Lands. The ministry was created from the responsibilities of the Secretary for Lands and the first minister, James Farnell, was also the Secretary for Lands. The initial tasks for the minister were establishing the Board of Mines, a school of mines and mineralogical museum. The minister was responsible for the department of mines, which included mining wardens, registrars, bailiffs and surveyors. The department also included agricultural regulation, including sheep and cattle inspectors and the registration of brands.

The agricultural responsibilities were recognised from 1890 when the title was changed to Secretary for Mines and Agriculture, until 1907 when a separate Minister for Agriculture was created. In 1959 the ministry was renamed Minister for Mines.

The resources portfolio was occasionally combined with the energy portfolio between 1984 and 2017.

List of ministers

References

Mines
Mining ministers